Yanwath and Eamont Bridge is a civil parish in the Eden District, Cumbria, England. It contains 15 listed buildings that are recorded in the National Heritage List for England. Of these, three are listed at Grade I, the highest of the three grades, one is at Grade II*, the middle grade, and the others are at Grade II, the lowest grade.  The parish contains the villages of Yanwath and Eamont Bridge, and the surrounding countryside.  The listed buildings consist of a tower house and associated structures, a road bridge, which is also a scheduled monument, a railway viaduct, houses and associated structures, a hotel, a public house, a farmhouse and farm buildings.


Key

Buildings

References

Citations

Sources

Lists of listed buildings in Cumbria